During the 1997–98 English football season, Everton competed in the FA Premier League (known as the FA Carling Premiership for sponsorship reasons).

Season summary
Everton began the season with three significant new signings – Slaven Bilić, John Oster and Gareth Farrelly – but the big news at Goodison Park was the return of Howard Kendall for his third spell as manager.

With financial problems growing and fans growing ever more hostile towards chairman Peter Johnson, Kendall was soon facing the biggest struggle of his managerial career. Everton – top division members continuously since 1954 – were battling against relegation and looked anything but a trophy-winning team that they so often had been during Kendall's earlier spells. They ended up surviving, but only avoided relegation to Division One because they had a greater goal difference than 18th-placed Bolton Wanderers. That kept Everton up, but Kendall resigned just weeks later and was replaced by the former Rangers manager Walter Smith.

Final league table

Results summary

Results by round

Results
Everton's score comes first

Legend

FA Premier League

FA Cup

League Cup

Squad (at end of season)

 (captain)

Left club during season

Reserve squad

Transfers

In

Out

Transfers in:  £5,600,000
Transfers out:  £9,500,000
Total spending:  £3,900,000

Statistics

Starting 11
Considering starts in all competitions
 GK: #31,  Thomas Myhre, 23
 RB: #12,  Craig Short, 29
 CB: #28,  Slaven Bilić, 25
 CB: #5,  Dave Watson, 28
 LB: #25,  Michael Ball, 23
 RM: #19,  John Oster, 19
 CM: #7,  Graham Stuart, 17
 CM: #17,  Gareth Farrelly, 20
 LM: #10,  Gary Speed, 24
 AM: #8,  Nick Barmby, 28
 CF: #9,  Duncan Ferguson, 31

Notes

References

Everton F.C. seasons
Everton